Wolaita Dicha U-20 F.C. or ወላይታ ዲቻ ከ20 ዓመት በታች እግር ኳስ ክሌብ is Ethiopian football club at an under-20 age level and is controlled by the Ethiopian Football Federation. Wolaita Dicha u-20 is a football club known for producing young players. Because of this the club makes a significant contribution to strengthen main Wolaita Dicha football team. During the 2021 tournament, the team was disbanded due to a lack of budgets. However, the club was reorganized the following year and won Ethiopian Under-20 Premier League title for the second time. The team typically contender in U-20 Premier League tournament in Ethiopia.

Stadium
Wolaita Dicha U-20 F.C. uses Wolaita Sodo Stadium for its home matches and training. During 2018/19 season Wolaita Sodo Stadium is under improvement and because of this the club used Boditi Stadium.

Competition and titles won
Wolaita dicha u-20 football club is most successful team which won Ethiopian u-20 premier league. The club also able to won 2022 premier league season after reorganizing itself from disbandment in preceding year.

References

Football clubs in Ethiopia
Sport in the Southern Nations, Nationalities, and Peoples' Region
Sport in Wolayita Zone